Solec may refer to several places in Poland:

Solec, Warsaw, a neighbourhood in Śródmieście, Warsaw
Solec, Łódź Voivodeship (central Poland)
Solec, Gostynin County in Masovian Voivodeship (east-central Poland)
Solec, Piaseczno County in Masovian Voivodeship (east-central Poland)
Solec, Środa Wielkopolska County in Greater Poland Voivodeship (west-central Poland)
Solec, Wolsztyn County in Greater Poland Voivodeship (west-central Poland)
Solec, Opole Voivodeship (south-west Poland)
Solec Kujawski, a town in Kuyavian-Pomeranian Voivodeship (northern Poland)
Solec Kujawski Commune, a gmina (administrative district) in Kuyavian-Pomeranian Voivodeship (northern Poland)
Solec nad Wisłą, a village on the Vistula river in Masovian Voivodeship (east-central Poland)
Solec Nowy, a village in Greater Poland Voivodeship (west-central Poland)